Justice Pearson may refer to:

Bird M. Pearson, associate justice of the Florida Supreme Court
Colin Pearson, Baron Pearson, Lord of Appeal in Ordinary
Richmond Mumford Pearson, chief justice of the North Carolina Supreme Court 
Vernon Robert Pearson, associate justice of the Washington Supreme Court